Pick Your Poison may refer to:

 "Pick Your Poison" (Good Girls)
 "Pick Your Poison" (Batwoman)
 Pick Your Poison (album)